Sharīf ʿAlī ibn ʿAjlān ibn Rumaithah ibn Muḥammad, also known as Barkat Ali or "Blessed Ali", was the third Sultan of Brunei, and son-in-law of the second Sultan of Brunei, Ahmad. He was also a scholar of Arab descent, originating from Ta'if in the Hejaz.

Genealogy 
Sharif Ali was a descendant of Imam Hasan ibn Ali. In addition, he served as the Emir of Mecca, and was entitled Al-Amīr Ash-Sharīf ʿAlī bin Ash-Sharīf ʿAjlān bin Ash-Sharīf Rumaithah bin Ash-Sharīf Muḥammad Abū Numāʾī Al-Awwal. The Sultan was also an ancestor of the Brunei and Sulu royal families.

Reign

Accession 
He ascended the throne in 1425 C.E., after Sultan Ahmad died without leaving any male descendants. However, the inauguration of Sharif Ali did not solely come from the royal family of Sultan Ahmad. Both Brunei citizens and royal counselors agreed that Sharif Ali be the Sultan, because of his deep knowledge in Islam. His merit in spreading Islam was related to his position as a royal ʿālim ('scholar') in Brunei, during the reign of Sultan Ahmad. For that reason, his marriage to Puteri Ratna Kesuma, the daughter of Sultan Ahmad, was aimed at strengthening his position as a Sultan and scholar. He was the first Sultan of Brunei with no genealogical relation to former Sultans of the Kingdom.

Activities 
Sharif Ali governed Brunei according to Islamic principles, and was therefore considered as a very pious ruler. Due to his popularity, he was nicknamed Sultan Berkat. He was the first sultan to build a Masjid, and fortified the defense of Brunei by ordering his people to build a stone fortress and town, that is Kota Batu. After his death in 1432, he was succeeded by his son Sulaiman.

Legacy 

As Sultan, Sharif Ali made several changes closely linked to Islamic Law, including basing the administration's rule on the law, straightening the direction of the Qiblah, and creating a law prohibiting people from eating pork. The penalty for violating this law was death. Besides religious affairs, Ali's administration was responsible for a number of legacies including creating an emblem and banner – the "Tunggul Alam Bernaga" – which symbolised the dignity of Brunei and the Crown of the Sultan. These artifacts continue to be utilized by the current Sultanate. The mausoleum of Sharif Ali is situated close to the Brunei Museum and the mausoleum of Sultan Bolkiah, the 5th Sultan of Brunei Darussalam. Sultan Sharif Ali's mausoleum was built as a tribute and recognition of his contribution to strengthening the Islamic foundations of the Sultanate. In addition to building Ali's mausoleum, Sultan Hassanal Bolkiah (the 29th Sultan of Brunei) also built a grand mosque named "Masjid Sultan Sharif Ali," as an appreciation for his contributions to Islam. Several institutions in Brunei also carry Sultan Sharif Ali's name, which include Sultan Sharif Ali Secondary School in Salambigar, Jalan Muara, and Sultan Sharif Ali Islamic University. The royal symbol's origin came from the World's largest seed, which is called "coco de mer."

Family tree 
Some sources are conflicting on authenticity of lineage as Ali ibn Ajlan had died in 1395.

See also 
 Far East
 Greater Sunda Islands
 Middle East
 Sharif ul-Hashim of Sulu
 Syed Abdul Rahman Alsagoff

References

External links 
 Monarchy
 Makam Sultan Sharif Ali
 Mausoleum of Sultan Sharif Ali

Bruneian people of Saudi Arabian descent
15th-century Sultans of Brunei
15th-century Arabs